Mary Frances Clardy (born November 15, 1958) is an American politician serving in the Minnesota House of Representatives since 2023. A member of the Minnesota Democratic–Farmer–Labor Party (DFL), Clardy represents District 53A in the southeastern Twin Cities metropolitan area, which includes the cities of Inver Grove Heights, Sunfish Lake, Lilydale, and parts of both Mendota Heights and West St. Paul in Minnesota.

Early life, education and career 
Clardy was born and raised in Burnsville. She earned a Bachelor of Arts degree in psychology from Minnesota State University - Mankato, her teaching certificate from the University of St. Thomas (Minnesota), and a Master of Education from Grand Canyon University.

Clardy began her career as a program manager at Twin Cities Habitat for Humanity. Since 1996, she has worked as a teacher and literacy coordinator in the Saint Paul Public Schools.

Clardy served on the Minneapolis Civil Rights Commission. She was appointed by Governor Mark Dayton to serve on the Minnesota Board of Teaching from 2014 to 2017, and was appointed by Governor Tim Walz to the Minnesota Board of School Administrators in 2019. She has also served on the Inver Grove Heights School Board. She also was a member of the Board of the Association of Metropolitan School Districts.

Minnesota House of Representatives 
Clardy was first elected to the Minnesota House of Representatives in November 2022. She serves as vice-chair of the Education Finance Committee and sits on the Sustainable Infrastructure Policy, Veterans and Military Affairs Finance and Policy, and Human Services Finances Committees.

Electoral history

References

External links 

Living people
Educators from Minnesota
Politicians from Minneapolis
People from Inver Grove Heights, Minnesota
Minnesota State University, Mankato alumni
Grand Canyon University alumni
Minnesota Democrats
Members of the Minnesota House of Representatives
Women state legislators in Minnesota
African-American state legislators in Minnesota

1958 births